And There Was Light: Abraham Lincoln and the American Struggle is biographical book about Abraham Lincoln. The book shows how Lincoln risked his political future for his moral convictions, intending to preserve democracy and the Union. It was written by Jon Meacham and published by Random House in October 2022.

References

Further reading
Brief review: 
Book review: 
Op Ed:

External links 

Author webpage. "And There Was Light."
Jon Meacham interview. Video. Today show. NBC News.
Jon Meacham interview. Video. Morning Joe. MSNBC.
Jon Meacham interview. Video. Stephanie Ruhle. MSNBC.
 

Non-fiction books about American slavery
American non-fiction books
21st-century history books
2022 non-fiction books
English-language books
Books about Abraham Lincoln
American Civil War books
Random House books
Warfare
1860s conflicts
19th-century rebellions